Mallochia is a genus of fungi in the family Gymnoascaceae.

References

External links

Eurotiomycetes genera
Onygenales
Taxa described in 1986